Gorgon euryale seed cake is a kind of Chinese dessert made from the gorgon fruit (Euryale ferox) seeds. It originated from the Xitang town of Jiashan County, Zhejiang. It tastes sweety and chewy.

Preparation 

The ingredients of the dessert include fresh gorgon fruit, sweet rice flour, and sugar. The gorgon fruit is boiled, dried in the sun and levigated. The resulting product is mixed with sweet rice flour, sugar and water. This dough is kneaded, compressed into rectangular shapes, and steamed.

The gorgon cake is said to tonify spleen and kidney.

References 

Chinese cuisine